The 2015–16 Marshall Thundering Herd men's basketball team represented Marshall University during the 2015–16 NCAA Division I men's basketball season. The Thundering Herd, led by second year head coach Dan D'Antoni, played their home games at the Cam Henderson Center and were members of Conference USA. They finished the season 17–16, 12–6 in C-USA play to finish in a three-way tie for third place. They defeated UTEP in the quarterfinals of the C-USA tournament to advance to the semifinals where they lost to Middle Tennessee.

Previous season
The Thundering Herd finished the 2014–15 season 11–21, 7–11 in C-USA play to finish in a tie for eleventh place. They lost in the first round of the C-USA tournament to WKU.

Offseason

Departures

Incoming transfers

2015 recruiting class

Roster

Schedule 

|-
!colspan=9 style=| Exhibition

|-
!colspan=9 style=| Non-conference regular season

|-
!colspan=12 style=| Conference USA regular season

|-
!colspan=9 style=| Conference USA tournament

References

Marshall Thundering Herd men's basketball seasons
Marshall
Marsh
Marsh